This is a list of electoral division results for the Australian 2013 federal election in the state of New South Wales.

Overall results

Results by division

Banks

Barton

Bennelong

Berowra

Blaxland

Bradfield

Calare

Charlton

Chifley

Cook

Cowper

Cunningham

Dobell

Eden-Monaro

Farrer

Fowler

Gilmore

Grayndler

Greenway

Hughes

Hume

Hunter

Kingsford Smith

Lindsay

Lyne

The sitting member was Rob Oakeshott who did not contest the election.

Macarthur

Mackellar

Macquarie

McMahon

Mitchell

New England

The sitting member was Tony Windsor who did not contest the election.

Newcastle

North Sydney

Page

Parkes

Parramatta

Paterson

Reid

Richmond

Riverina

Robertson

Shortland

Sydney

Throsby

Warringah

Watson

Wentworth

Werriwa

References

See also 

 2013 Australian federal election
 Results of the 2013 Australian federal election (House of Representatives)
 Post-election pendulum for the 2013 Australian federal election
 Members of the Australian House of Representatives, 2013–2016

New South Wales 2013